Central States Indemnity Company (CSI) is an insurance company based in Omaha, Nebraska. It is a subsidiary of Berkshire Hathaway.

External links
 Official homepage

Financial services companies established in 1932
Insurance companies of the United States
Berkshire Hathaway
Companies based in Omaha, Nebraska